Tomáš Pitule (born November 10, 1989) is a Czech professional ice hockey player currently with UK Elite Ice Hockey League (EIHL) side Sheffield Steelers.

Pitule has played most of his career in his native Czech Republic, with spells at HC Shakhtyor Soligorsk and HC Neman Grodno of the Belarusian Extraleague, in France with Brûleurs de Loups, and in Slovakia with HC Nové Zámky. He played with HC Plzeň in the Czech Extraliga during the 2010–11 Czech Extraliga season.

References

External links

1989 births
Living people
BK Mladá Boleslav players
Brûleurs de Loups players
Czech ice hockey forwards
HC Dukla Jihlava players
Rytíři Kladno players
HC Nové Zámky players
HC Plzeň players
HC Shakhtyor Soligorsk players
Motor České Budějovice players
People from Rokycany
Piráti Chomutov players
Sheffield Steelers players
Sportspeople from the Plzeň Region
Czech expatriate ice hockey players in Slovakia
Czech expatriate sportspeople in Belarus
Czech expatriate sportspeople in England
Czech expatriate sportspeople in France
Expatriate ice hockey players in Belarus
Expatriate ice hockey players in England
Expatriate ice hockey players in France